Maytown is the name of several places. 

In the United States:
Maytown, Alabama
Maytown, Florida
Maytown, Kentucky
Maytown, Pennsylvania
Maytown, Washington

Australia:
Maytown, Queensland

United Kingdom:
Maytown, County Armagh, a townland in County Armagh, Northern Ireland

See also
Mayville